Brabazon Point is a headland forming the east side of the entrance to Salvesen Cove, on the west coast of Graham Land. It was charted by the Belgian Antarctic Expedition under Gerlache, 1897–99, and named by the UK Antarctic Place-Names Committee in 1960 for John Moore-Brabazon, 1st Baron Brabazon of Tara, pioneer British aviator, the first Englishman to pilot a heavier-than-air machine under power in England (described in his Times obituary as the "first flight accomplished by any Briton in Great Britain"), in April 1909, and responsible for the R.F.C. Photographic Section during World War I and for the development of aerial photography.

References
 

Headlands of Graham Land
Danco Coast